Athena Hollins (born October 18, 1983) is an American politician serving in the Minnesota House of Representatives since 2021. A member of the Minnesota Democratic–Farmer–Labor Party (DFL), Hollins represents District 66B, which includes parts of Saint Paul in Ramsey County, Minnesota. 

Since 2023, Hollins has served as majority whip for the House DFL caucus.

Early life, education, and career 

Born in Hawaii, Hollins attended Reed College, graduating with a B.A., and the University of Saint Thomas, graduating with a J.D in 2011.

After graduating from law school, Hollins practiced family law and estate planning. She served as president of the Payne-Phalen Community Council. She works in community relations and diversity and inclusion, serving as a senior director of diversity and foundations.

Minnesota House of Representatives 

Hollins was elected to the Minnesota House of Representatives in 2020 and was reelected in 2022. She challenged nine-term DFL incumbent John Lesch for the DFL endorsement and lost, but defeated him in the primary election.

Hollins serves as the majority whip for the House DFL caucus and vice chair of the Rules and Legislative Administration Committee. She sits on the Climate and Energy Finance and Policy and Public Safety Finance and Policy Committees, as well as the Property Tax Division of the Taxes Committee. Hollins is a member of the House People of Color & Indigenous (POCI) Caucus, the Black Maternal Health Caucus, and the Queer Caucus.

Hollins authored a bill to ban the use of conversion therapy for minors and vulnerable adults, which passed the House floor in 2021 and 2023. She also introduced legislation to ban the "gay panic defense" used to plead down murder charges against LGBTQ victims. Hollins sponsored successful legislation to eliminate the statute of limitations on reporting sexual assault.

In 2021, Hollins introduced legislation to ban the use of no-knock warrants in the state of Minnesota, however lawmakers ended up approving a less restrictive policy. After the police killing of Amir Locke, she introduced a bill to further limit no-knocks, which Governor Walz stated he would sign if it came to his desk. That proposal passed the House floor in 2022 as part of a larger public safety bill, but was opposed by Senate Republicans and chair of the Senate Public Safety Committee, Warren Limmer. Hollins has been critical of the Minnesota Police and Peace Officer's Association, stating the MPPOA has been "steadfast in support of the status quo".

Hollins signed on to a letter calling on the Biden administration to stop Line 3, a tar sands pipeline proposed to cut through Minnesota tribal lands. She authored legislation requiring manufacturers to disclose when PFAS chemicals are added to their products, and a bill to jump-start the battery industry for storing renewable energy. Hollins supports legalizing marijuana and expunging prior convictions.

Electoral history

Personal life 
Hollins lives in the Payne-Phalen neighborhood of Saint Paul, Minnesota, with her spouse, and has one child.

References

External links 

 Official House of Representatives website
 Official campaign website

1983 births
Living people
Democratic Party members of the Minnesota House of Representatives
Women state legislators in Minnesota
21st-century American politicians
Reed College alumni
University of St. Thomas (Minnesota) alumni
Minnesota lawyers
21st-century American women politicians